Odeta Nishani  (born, Odeta Kosova, on 5 May 1969 in Elbasan, Albania) is the widow of the 6th President of Albania, Bujar Nishani.
Her father originates from a Kosovo merchants’ family that settled in Elbasan in 1905, while her mother comes from the Karaosmani family and whose grandfather was one of the signers of the Independence Act and who served as Minister of Agriculture in Ismail Qemali’s government.

Nishani grew up in Elbasan and she completed her pre-higher education at Dhaskal Todri High School.

After that, she graduated in Civil and Industrial Construction Engineering form Polytechnic University of Tirana in 1993. She married Bujar Nishani in 1994.

Nishani started her professional career as Investments Director at the Military Academy and she continued for a decade as a Constructions' Engineer and Constructer at the Institute of Studies and Projects. The status of the First Lady, found Mrs. Nishani in the field of Tourism Development professionally serving as Director of Market Study and Tourism Statistics at the Ministry of Tourism, Culture, Youth and Sports. Mrs. Nishani holds a master's degree in Tourism Management – a field where she has been contributing during the seven recent years.

References

1969 births
Living people
First ladies of Albania
People from Elbasan
Albanian Muslims
21st-century Albanian women politicians
21st-century Albanian politicians